Julia Cruz (born 7 September 1968) is a Spanish diver. She competed at the 1992 Summer Olympics and the 1996 Summer Olympics.

References

1968 births
Living people
Spanish female divers
Olympic divers of Spain
Divers at the 1992 Summer Olympics
Divers at the 1996 Summer Olympics
Divers from Madrid